Glynn Clark Mallory Jr. (February 10, 1939 – February 20, 2020) was a lieutenant general in the United States Army. He was commissioned upon graduation from the United States Military Academy in 1961.

Mallory died on February 20, 2020.

References

1939 births
2020 deaths
United States Army personnel of the Gulf War
United States Army personnel of the Vietnam War
Recipients of the Distinguished Service Medal (US Army)
Recipients of the Legion of Merit
Recipients of the Silver Star
United States Army generals
United States Military Academy alumni